The Robert Morris Colonials women represented Robert Morris University in CHA women's ice hockey during the 2018-19 NCAA Division I women's ice hockey season. The Colonials won their third consecutive regular season title, but lost in the CHA Tournament Championship 6-2 to the Syracuse Orange.

Offseason
4/4: Jaycee Gephard was named to the 22-player roster of the Canadian National Women's Development Team.

Recruiting

Standings

Roster

2018–19 Colonials

2018-19 schedule
Source:

|-
!colspan=12 style=" "| Regular Season

|-
!colspan=12 style=" "|CHA Tournament

Awards and honors
The Colonials earned the CHA Team Sportsmanship Award

 Jaycee Gephard was named to the CHA All-Conference First Team
 Maggie LaGue was named to the CHA All-Conference First Team
 Lexi Templeman was named to the CHA All-Conference Second Team
 Emily Curlett was named to the CHA All-Conference Second Team

References

Robert Morris
Robert Morris Lady Colonials ice hockey seasons
Robert
Robert